Ko Sesha is an Indian lyricist and dialogue writer working on Tamil language films. After making his debut in Kanchana 2  (2015), he received critical acclaim for his work in Oh My Kadavule (2020).

Early life and career
Sesha was brought up in Chennai and attended Padma Seshadri Bala Bhavan, KK Nagar and was inspired by the works of lyricist Vaali. As a youth, he contributed regularly as a writer to his school's magazine and also worked on The Hindu's youth publications. 

Sesha then made his first film song "Vaaya En Veera" in Leon James's music in the successful Kanchana 2 (2015). Leon had been a junior of Sesha at school, and the pair regularly later collaborated for other films including Kavalai Vendam (2016), Veera (2018), LKG (2019) and Oh My Kadavule (2020). He has also worked on several songs composed by the Vivek-Mervin duo, Vijay Antony, Hiphop Tamizha and S. Thaman.

He made a guest appearance as an actor in the music video "Suzhaluren" directed by Rajath Ravishankar, composed by Leon James.

Notable discography

As a lyricist

Films

Independent

As a dialogue writer

Films

Awards and nominations

Mirchi Music Awards South:
2020: Listener's Choice of the Year - Tamil for "Kadhaippoma" from Oh My Kadavule: Won
2020: Best Lyricist - Tamil for "Kadhaippoma" from Oh My Kadavule: Nominated

Filmfare Awards South:
2020: Best Lyricist - Tamil for "Kadhaippoma" from Oh My Kadavule: Nominated

SIIMA Awards:
2020: Best Lyricist - Tamil for "Kadhaippoma" from Oh My Kadavule: Nominated

Vikatan Awards:
2020: Best Lyricist for "Kadhaippoma" from Oh My Kadavule: Nominated

Edison Awards:
2020: Best Lyricist - Tamil for "Marappadhillai Nenje" from Oh My Kadavule: Nominated

References

Tamil film poets
Tamil-language lyricists
Living people
Indian Tamil people
Year of birth missing (living people)